Timmins is a city in northeastern Ontario, Canada, located on the Mattagami River. The city is the fourth-largest city in the Northeastern Ontario region with a population of 41,145 (2021). The city's economy is based on natural resource extraction, and is supported by industries related to lumbering, and to the mining of gold, zinc, copper, nickel and silver. Timmins serves as a regional service and distribution centre. The city has a large Francophone community, with more than 50% bilingual in French and English.

History

Research performed by archaeologists indicate that human settlement in the area is at least 6,000 years old; it's believed the oldest traces found are from a nomadic people of the Shield Archaic tradition.

Up until contact with settlers, the land belonged to the Mattagami First Nation peoples. Treaty Number Nine of 1906 pushed this tribe to the north side of the Mattagami Lake, the site of a Hudson's Bay trading post first established in 1794. In the 1950s, the reserve was relocated to the south side of the lake, to its present-day location.

Gold mines

Gold discoveries in the Porcupine Camp during the early years of the 20th Century attracted investors to the area.

According to local folklore, on June 9, 1909, Harry Preston slipped on a rocky knoll and the heels of his boots stripped the moss to reveal a large vein of gold, which later became the Dome Mine. Another theory on how gold was discovered in the Timmins region is that an Indigenous man led Harry Preston to the location where he knew gold would be found. These, however, are only folklore commonly known by citizens of Timmins. A historically accurate account of the very first gold discovery in the area remains unknown.

On October 9, 1909, Benny Hollinger discovered the gold-bearing quartz dike that later became known as the Hollinger Mines. Brothers Noah Timmins and Henry Timmins bought Benny Hollinger's share from him, thus partnering with Hollinger's employers, the McMartin brothers.

On the same day as the Hollinger discovery, Sandy McIntyre discovered the McIntyre Mine near Pearl Lake, four miles away. These mines are known as the "Big Three".

Hollinger Mines was incorporated in 1910 with five equal partners consisting of former Mattawa, Ontario, shopkeeper brothers, Noah and Henry Timmins; Duncan and John McMartin, also brothers; and Mattawa attorney David Dunlap (1863–1924).

In November 1912, 1,200 members of the Western Federation of Miners Local 145 held a strike at all three mines in response to a proposal to lower their wages. Mine operators hired gun thugs, who fired on the picket line and were ordered out by the provincial government. After months without work, many men chose to leave the settlement; only 500 miners returned to work in July 1913. The strike won the men a nine-hour workday and a pay increase.

The Great Depression did not adversely affect the economy of the area, and jobs were available in mining and lumber.

The gold mines declined in the 1950s.

Settlement
The area, then known as the Tisdale township in the Cochrane District of Ontario, became home to dozens of prospectors during the "Porcupine Gold Rush", who explored the areas around Porcupine Lake and the Frederick House River. Rich ore deposits in the Canadian Shield led to Timmins being founded as a company town to house Hollinger employees. In 1912, mine manager Alphonse "Al" Paré named the growing mining camp for his uncle, Noah Timmins, who was President of Hollinger Mines. Many settlers grouped in camps around Porcupine Lake and the hamlet of Domethe Dome Mines Limited settlement at the Dome Mine, one mile from the lake. Four miles down the road, around the McIntyre Mine, the hamlet of Schumacher was established.

The rail system that began to operate around Timmins in 1911 accelerated the growth of the camps. That same year, two days after the first train arrived in the Porcupine, the entire area was destroyed in the Great Porcupine Fire. The fire had destroyed  of forest, and killed approximately 70 people, although it is estimated that the fire claimed the lives of 200 people. The deceased were buried along Porcupine Lake, at Dead Man's Point, now known as Tisdale Cemetery. The camp began to be rebuilt within a few days.

In 1917, a dam was built at Kenogamissi Falls, downriver from Mattagami Lake, to provide power for the Timmins-Porcupine mining camp; Mattagami Lake was consequently flooded.

In 1973, 35 townships covering 1,260 square mile, including Porcupine, South Porcupine, Schumacher, and Timmins were organized into the City of Timmins.

In the 1990s, the City of Timmins became a regional service and distribution centre for Northeastern Ontario.

Climate
Timmins is near the northern periphery of the hemiboreal humid continental climate (Dfb). Timmins has very cold winters, being in Northern Ontario, but temperatures in late summer and autumn tend to be among the coldest for any major city in any Canadian province. During the spring and summer, temperatures can rise considerably.

Demographics

Language
In Timmins, according to the 2016 census, 63.7% of the population reported English as their first language (Anglophone), 35.6% reported French (Francophone) as their first language, and 0.12% reported a non-official language, neither English nor French, as their first language (Allophone). 50.8% of the population is bilingual in English and French.

Arts and culture

Tourism

Some of the main tourist attractions within the city include: The Timmins Museum and National Exhibition Centre, Cedar Meadows Wilderness Tours, Mount Jamieson Resort (formerly known as Kamiskotia Snow Resort), Porcupine Ski Runners Cross-Country Trails and Chalet, Hollinger Golf Club, Spruce Needles Golf Club, the Sandy Falls Golf Club, the McIntyre Community Building and the Timmins Snowmobile Club. Snowmobiling impacts the Timmins economy, as tourists travel from all over North America to explore area trails.

Hollinger Park is one of the city's main recreational spaces. The park is divided in two sections, the north side being the public park area, with the south side having a regulation sized baseball diamond and two soccer fields for more organized outdoor recreational endeavours. The baseball park has been home to the Timmins Men's Baseball League since 1985. Former Timmins resident Shania Twain played a concert at Hollinger Park on July 1, 1999. An estimated 22,000 people attended the outdoor concert.

Nearby communities include Barbers Bay, Dugwal, Finn Road, Hoyle, Ice Chest Lake, McIntosh Springs and Nighthawk. Local history in the area dates back over 300 years.

La Galeruche Art Gallery, located at 32 Mountjoy Street North (Centre Culturel La Ronde), provides local francophone artists with a venue to exhibit and sell their work. The building has since been torn down, but plans to rebuild are underway, as of March 2022.

The Porcupine Miner's Memorial tribute is a statue of the miner, head frame and tablets bearing the names of 594 miners killed in mining accidents were unveiled in 2008. The following year, the statues of a mother and two children were unveiled to commemorate those families left behind.

The Timmins Public Library was constructed in 2005 with locally manufactured products, using wood as the main structural material, making efficient use of natural resources while reducing construction waste. The eco-friendly design was recognized by the Green Building Initiative, and the building achieved a 3 Green Globes rating for its efficient use of resources and sustainable development.

Government

The city's current mayor is Michelle Boileau.

Eight councillors serve with the mayor to complete the municipal government. Those eight councillors are elected to one of five areas of the city through a ward electoral system; rural parts of the city elect one councillor each, while the urban core of the city is in a multi-member ward that elects four councillors (through Plurality block voting). Councillors are elected to a four-year term.

Timmins City Council

Rock Whissell, Ward 1 Councillor
Lorne Feldman, Ward 2 Councillor
Bill Gvozcanovic, Ward 3 Councillor
John P. Curley, Ward 4 Councillor
Michelle Boileau, Ward 5 Councillor
Andrew Marks, Ward 5 Councillor
Kristin Murray, Ward 5 Councillor
Cory Robin, Ward 5 Councillor

Provincial 
The city was represented in the Legislative Assembly of Ontario by MPP Gilles Bisson from 1990 until 2022, when he was defeated by Pirie.

Federal 
The Member of Parliament for Timmins-James Bay is currently Charlie Angus.

Education

Postsecondary education
The two main postsecondary institutions in Timmins is Northern College, a College of Applied Arts and Technology and Collège Boréal, which also has a sister campus of Université de Hearst. Algoma University also offers degrees in Social Work and Community Development on the Northern College Campus in South Porcupine.

School boards
Four school boards serve the City of Timmins:
 District School Board Ontario North East
 Northeastern Catholic District School Board
 Conseil scolaire catholique de district des Grandes-Rivières
 Conseil scolaire de district du Nord-Est de l'Ontario

High schools
 O'Gorman High School
 École Publique Renaissance
 École secondaire catholique Thériault
 Timmins High and Vocational School
 Roland Michener Secondary School

Media

In 1952, broadcast pioneer J. Conrad Lavigne launched CFCL, the first French-language radio station in Ontario. Prior to the introduction of cable television to the Timmins area in the latter part of the 1970s, the city's available TV channels consisted of English-language channel 3 broadcast out of Sudbury and CFCL's channel 6 (in English) and channel 9 (in French) broadcast from CFCL's studio located at the north end of Pine Street.

The Timmins Daily Press is the main English publication, publishing six issues per week. Other French-language media include newspapers Le Voyageur and Le Journal L'Express de Timmins.

Healthcare
Timmins and District Hospital (TADH) is an accredited referral and teaching hospital that serves Timmins, Cochrane District, Temiskaming, Sudbury and Algoma Districts. Weeneebayko Area Health Authority also use TADH to transfer patients requiring more advanced care not available in their community health care centres.

The 134-bed hospital was formed in 1988 from the merger of St. Mary's General Hospital and Porcupine General Hospital, now Spruce Hill Lodge, a retirement home. The two former hospitals were replaced in 1996 and 1993, respectively, when the current site was built.

Sports

The Timmins Rock of the Northern Ontario Junior Hockey League represent Timmins in hockey. They are the city's junior A team. And their affiliate, Timmins Majors, of the Great North Midget League, are the Midget AAA team. They both play at the McIntyre Arena.

Jewish community 
From the foundation of the city, jewish emigrants, mostly from Russia and Eastern europe came to the town in order to work in the mines industry. at 1917 Rabbi Yaakov schulman arrived in the city and was incharge of religious needs, such as Kosher meet. In 1925 there were 200 jews living in the city. In that year the jewish community was officially astablished. the community was not issolated and maintained good relationship's with non-jews, especially emigrants from Russia and Eastern europe, who spoke the same languages they did. Only in the 1930's actual community Institutes were built, such as a synagouge and a school. 

since 1928 the jewish community held an annual Purim Ball. The ball was mixed: jews and non-jews, men and women. part of the ball was a beauty pagent named "malkat ester".

The Jewish population peaked around the 1950s, it included around 160 families. 

In the early 1970s the Timmins synagogue was closed due to a decrease in the town’s Jewish population.

Transportation
Timmins Victor M. Power Airport is the main regional airport for the Timmins area. Regional ground transportation is provided by Ontario Northland Motor Coach Services operating out of the Timmins Transit Terminal.
The nearest communities with train service are more than 100 kilometres away. They include Foleyet to the west and Gogama to the south, which are served by The Canadian, Via Rail's  transcontinental passenger rail service. To the north of Timmins, Cochrane is the southern terminus of the Ontario Northland Railway's Polar Bear Express. Matheson and Porquis Junction were formerly the closest stations to the city. Local transit is provided by Timmins Transit.

Notable people

 Alfred Aho, computer scientist, member of US National Academies, professor at Columbia University, Turing Award winner
 Charlie Angus, musician and songwriter for the band Grievous Angels, currently serving as the New Democratic Party Member of Parliament for Timmins—James Bay since 2004.
 Paul Bellini, comedy writer and television actor
 Gilles Bisson, Ontario New Democratic Party Member of Provincial Parliament from 1990-2022 for the provincial riding of Timmins.
 Michael Boisvert, actor
 Natalie Brown, actress
 Dave Carroll and Don Carroll, country/pop/folk band Sons of Maxwell
 Carlo Cattarello, Order of Canada & Queen's Jubilee Medal recipient
Lina Chartrand, writer
 Jamie M. Dagg, film director
 Derek Edwards, comedian
 John Labow, actor and television producer
 Maurice LaMarche, comedian and voice actor
 J. Conrad Lavigne, broadcasting pioneer
 Lights (born Valerie Poxleitner), vocalist, singer-songwriter
 Cecil Linder, actor
Frank Mahovlich, NHL Hall of Fame player and Canadian Senator
Peter Mahovlich, NHL player
 Bruce McCaffrey, Progressive Conservative MPP
 Derek McGrath actor
 Gord Miller, former Environment Commissioner of Ontario
 Alan Pope, former Progressive Conservative MPP
 Jim Prentice, former Premier of Alberta, former Member of Parliament from Calgary and federal cabinet minister
 Myron Scholes, Nobel Prize winning economist
 Philippe Tatartcheff, Swiss-born poet and songwriter notable for writing songs in French with Anna and Kate McGarrigle
 Gordon Thiessen, governor of the Bank of Canada from 1994 to 2001
 Roy Thomson, 1st Baron Thomson of Fleet, newspaper magnate, started his empire in the 1930s with the Timmins Daily Press
 Lola Lemire Tostevin, novelist and poet
 Shania Twain, musician
 Bruce Watson, guitarist with Scottish rock band Big Country
 Preston Pablo, musician
See also: List of mayors of Timmins.

Notable athletes
 Pete Babando, National Hockey League (NHL) hockey player
 Bill Barilko, NHL hockey player and subject of the 1993 Tragically Hip song "Fifty Mission Cap"
 Aldege "Baz" Bastien, NHL goaltender
 Sharon Bruneau, female bodybuilder, fitness competitor, actress and stuntwoman
 Les Costello, NHL hockey player with the Toronto Maple Leafs 1947–49. Later became a Roman Catholic priest in Timmins while continuing to play hockey for the "Flying Fathers"
 Réal Chevrefils, NHL hockey player with the Boston Bruins 1951–59.
 Murray Costello, Hockey Hall of Famer, president of the Canadian Amateur Hockey Association
 Larry Courville, NHL hockey player
 Shean Donovan, NHL hockey player
 Paul Harrison, NHL hockey player
 Alex Henry, NHL hockey player
 Art Hodgins, Ice hockey player, inducted in the British Ice Hockey Hall of Fame
 Mark Katic, NHL hockey player
 Kathy Kreiner, Gold medallist, giant slalom, XIIth Olympic Winter Games, Innsbruck, Austria, 13 February 1976
 Laurie Kreiner, Alpine skiing, XI Olympic Winter Games, XIIth Olympic Winter Games
 Jason Gervais, Athletics discus, Sydney 2000 Summer Olympics
 Denis Lapalme, amputee athlete and Paralympic medalist
 Rick Lessard, NHL hockey player
 T. J. Luxmore, NHL Referee
 Frank Mahovlich, NHL hockey player, Canadian Senator
 Pete Mahovlich, NHL hockey player
 Jim Mair, NHL hockey player
 Hector Marini, NHL hockey player
Bob McCord, NHL hockey player
 Gus Mortson, NHL hockey player
 Bob Nevin, NHL hockey player
 Dave Poulin, NHL hockey player
 Dean Prentice, NHL hockey player
 Eric "Doc" Prentice, NHL hockey player
 Dale Rolfe, NHL hockey player
 Steve Shields, NHL goaltender
 Allan Stanley, NHL hockey player
 Steve Sullivan, NHL hockey player
 Walter Tkaczuk, NHL hockey player
 Eric Vail, NHL hockey player, 1975 Calder Trophy winner

See also
Neighbourhoods in Timmins
Kidd Mine
List of francophone communities in Ontario

References

External links

 

 
Cities in Ontario
Mining communities in Ontario
Single-tier municipalities in Ontario